Billy Pinnell (aka "The Traveller") (died 1977) was the sports editor of the Bristol Evening Post from the first day of publication in April 1932 until his retirement 34 years later on 31 December 1956.

Career
During his career he covered over 1,500 Bristol City and Rovers football matches. As over 600 of them were away from home, he lived up to his pen name of "The Traveller."

He started with the Bristol Times and Mirror in 1919 later moving to the old Times and Echo, before the inception of the Evening Post.

Billy Pinnell's record of service to local soccer began in 1909 when he first became a member of the Gloucestershire Football Association Council.

In 1959 he was awarded his most prized possession, the Football Association Medal for his 50 years' work for the GFA, of which he was a life vice-president.

As a sportsman himself, Billy played football and bowled. In his younger days he was a keen cyclist. He later served on many sporting committees.

1977 deaths
Year of birth missing
English newspaper editors
English male journalists